The 2018 season is Shan United's 9th season in the Myanmar National League since 2009.

Season Review

2018 First team squad

Continental record

Transfer

In
 Lee Han-kuk - from  Phrae United F.C.
 William Nyakwe - from Yadanarbon
 Patrick Asare - from Yadanarbon
 Phone Thit Sar Min - from Shan United Youth team

Out
 Soe Lwin Lwin - to Magwe
 Myat Tun Thit - to Magwe
 Nay Myo Aung - to Rakhine United

Coaching staff
{|class="wikitable"
|-
!Position
!Staff
|-
|Manager|| Mr. Aung Kyaw Tun
|-
|rowspan="2"|Assistant Manager|| Mr. Han Win Aung
|-
| Mr. Aung Tun Tun
|-
|Technical Coach||
|-
|Goalkeeper Coach|| Mr. Aung Thet
|-
|Fitness Coach||  
|-

Other information

|-

References

Shan United